The GE U30CG was a passenger-hauling diesel-electric locomotive built by GE Transportation Systems.  It was a passenger variant of GE's U30C design purchased by the Atchison, Topeka and Santa Fe Railway.  ATSF had purchased ten U28CG locomotives in 1966, but while these locomotives were satisfactory operationally, they looked like freight locomotives, not passenger locomotives.  Desiring smooth-sided passenger power, the railroad ordered the first cowl units from both GE and GM-EMD.  GE produced the U30CG to meet this requirement.  It was identical to a U30C except that the bodywork was replaced with a full-width long hood with fluted stainless-steel panels, and a full-width rounded nose and slanted cab front were fitted.

GE's original design had the rounded nose flush with the pilot front, but the Santa Fe rejected this, and the locomotives were fitted with a front walkway.  The locomotives were painted in the Santa Fe's famous Warbonnet colors, in exactly the same style as the railroad's F units — unlike the modified scheme used on the U28CGs.  The six production locomotives were delivered to the ATSF (road numbers 400-405) in November 1967, a month before EMD's competing FP45s.

The locomotives' initial primary assignment was to the Grand Canyon Limited between Chicago and Los Angeles, but they were also seen on the Super Chief as well as secondary trains such as the Texas Chief and the San Diegan.  All this came to an end on February 9, 1969 when a U30CG derailed hauling the Grand Canyon Limited on Edelstein Hill near Chillicothe, Illinois.  The U30CG design was suspected, and both classes of GE passenger locomotives were placed on freight assignments, and never were reinstated to passenger service.

Shortly, the U30CGs were renumbered to #8000–8005 and over time were repainted into blue and yellow (either the old freight scheme or Warbonnet), had their steam generators removed, the openings covered, and the shared fuel/water underbody tanks converted to fuel only for greater range. They were used mainly in Colorado freight service and other secondary assignments until September 22, 1980, when they were traded in to GE for new GE B36-7 locomotives.

See also
 GE P30CH - Another passenger variant of the U30C.

References

External links
 Photos of U30CG locomotives

C-C locomotives
U30CG
Atchison, Topeka and Santa Fe Railway locomotives
Passenger locomotives
Diesel-electric locomotives of the United States
Railway locomotives introduced in 1967
Scrapped locomotives
Standard gauge locomotives of the United States